Petty officer, 2nd class,  PO2, is a Naval non-commissioned member rank of the Canadian Forces. It is senior to the rank of master sailor (formerly master seaman) and its equivalents, and junior to petty officer 1st-class and its equivalents. Its Army and Air Force equivalent is sergeant (Sgt); together, Sgts and PO2s make up the cadre of senior non-commissioned officers. 

The rank insignia of the PO2 is three gold chevrons, point down, surmounted by a gold maple leaf. PO2s are generally initially addressed as "Petty Officer Bloggins", or "PO Bloggins", and thereafter as "PO", although in correspondence the full rank or abbreviation is used before the member's name. The full appellation "Petty Officer 2nd-Class" or "PO2" in speech is generally used only when the "second-class" distinction be made, such as to distinguish between members with similar names but differing ranks, or on promotion parades. The corresponding NATO rank is OR-6. However, "Petty Officer 2nd-Class" with less than 3 years seniority are considered OR-5.

PO2s generally mess and billet with chief petty officers and other petty officers, and their army and air-force equivalents, warrant officers and sergeant. Their mess on naval bases or installations is generally named the "Chiefs and POs Mess".

See also
 Non-commissioned member
 Petty Officer
 Non-commissioned officer

Military ranks of Canada